Virgil Parks McKinley (October 2, 1874 – July 3, 1954) was an American football coach and university faculty member. He began the college football program at Troy State University–then known as Troy Normal School–serving as the school's first head football coach in 1909, compiling a record of 1–0–2.

McKinley was a graduate of the University of Alabama and, later, Columbia University. After his time at Columbia, he returned to Alabama to become in industrial engineering faculty member.

Head coaching record

References

External links
 

1874 births
1954 deaths
Troy Trojans football coaches
Columbia University alumni
University of Alabama alumni
University of Alabama faculty